Winogradskyella rapida is a Gram-negative, aerobic, rod-shaped and heterotrophic bacterium from the genus of Winogradskyella which has been isolated from protein-enriched seawater from the Scripps Pier.

References

Flavobacteria
Bacteria described in 2009